Vijaykumar (8 December 1944 – 24 August 1974) better known by his stage name Sasikumar, was an Indian actor and army officer who worked mainly in Tamil cinema.

Early life 
Sasikumar was born Vijaykumar on 8 December 1944 to Radhakrishnan and Savithri in Kumbakonam, Tamil Nadu. Radhakrishnan, a follower of E. V. Ramasamy, worked at the National College, Tiruchirappalli as a Hindi professor. Vijaykumar studied chemistry at the same college, eventually graduating with a B.Sc degree.

Career 
While in his third year at college, Vijaykumar joined the army and became the second lieutenant; he registered under the name "Vetriselvan", previously conferred upon him by E. V. Ramasamy. After completing his college education, he was promoted to lieutenant and went to Patiala. During the Sino-Indian War of 1962, he took over the leadership of the Button Bearing Division and won the President's Medal of Valour for driving out soldiers without using the bearings in the war. He later went to Madras (now Chennai) after being relieved of his military service, married Sasikala and founded a theatre troupe, acting in many of his plays. When filmmaker A. P. Nagarajan saw one of those plays and was impressed with Vijaykumar's performance, he cast him in Thirumalai Thenkumari (1970), making it Vijaykumar's film debut; Vijaykumar adopted the stage name Sasikumar, partly inspired by his wife. He went on to act in numerous successful films, including ...Aval!, Kasethan Kadavulada (both 1972), Arangetram, Bharatha Vilas, Rajapart Rangadurai, Suryagandhi (all in 1973), and Vellikizhamai Viratham (1974).

Death 
Sasikumar was leaving for a Congress public meeting when Sasikala was caught in a fire when she lit cooking gas in the kitchen. When Sasikumar tried to save his wife from the fire, a fire spread on her. Both were taken to Royapettah Hospital. However, both died on 24 August 1974. They had two children at the time, a six-year old daughter and a four-year old son, who were subsequently raised by their grandmother. His son Vijaya sarathy was a famous  Sun TV anchor who hosted many successful programs in 90s and 2000s.

Filmography

References

External links 

1944 births
1974 deaths
Actors in Tamil theatre
Deaths from fire
Indian Army officers
Male actors from Tamil Nadu